Amirabad District is a district (bakhsh) in Damghan County, Semnan Province, Iran. At the 2006 census, its population was 9,026, in 2,717 families.  The District has one city: Amiriyeh.  The District has three rural districts (dehestan): Qohab-e Rastaq Rural District, Qohab-e Sarsar Rural District, and Tuyehdarvar Rural District.

References 

Districts of Semnan Province
Damghan County